Ashok Kumar Pradhan (born 13 December 1953) is an Indian industrialist and politician from Uttar Pradesh. He as served as the Member of Parliament (MP) in Lok Sabha representing Khurja (Noida) from 1996 to 2009 as Bharatiya Janata Party (BJP) candidate.

Ashok Pradhan is a former Minister of State (MoS), Government of India in the third Vajpayee ministry for various ministries – Consumer Affairs- Food & Public Distribution, Human Resources & Development.

Early career 

Ashok Pradhan was actively involved in various social works  & was also involved in the Bharatiya Janta Party Yuva Morcha since his early life. His introduction to politics happened when one of his elder brother, Dr. Gyan Chand, in 1967 contested an election under the Republican Party of India, from Khureji in Trans-Yamuna, Delhi. After that Dr. Gyan Chand joined Jan Sangh. Ashok Pradhan's involvement was further observed & appreciated in 1993 during the Delhi Vidhan Sabha Constitute, where his brother-Dr. Gyan Chand was elected as an MLA.

A firm believer in the saying 'Charity begins at home', he founded the Dr. Ambedkar Thrift & Credit Society in 1985 in his home village. The society was primarily established to put an end to the existing 'Sahukar-pratha'. This gave way to a new life for the over-exploited villagers. Till today the society stands strong & is benefiting the villagers beyond words. this society is one of a kind and is not run by any government funding or involvement, and is run solely by the villagers of Ghondli. Ashok Pradhan also started various other programmes for the welfare of his home village much before he entered active politics, such as- the 'Ambedkar Gram Sudhar Samiti' which focuses on the cleanliness of the village & awareness on health issues amongst the villagers. He also proved all odds wrong by establishing himself as one of the successful industrialists in Delhi, by setting up Sakshee Udyog.

Political career 
4 times LS member.
Pradhan contested his first election in the year 1996, under the flag of Bhartiya Janta Party, from Khurja-Noida, U.P. as his constituency. He won by great margins & became Member of Parliament for the said constituency. He broke all records in 1998, when he won by the highest margin in Uttar Pradesh and ranking in top ten in the country. He emerged a winner consecutively in the 11th, 12th, 13th & 14th Lokh-Sabha. During this period he presided over Food & Distribution ministry, Labour & Welfare ministry, Human Resources & Development ministry and Telecommunication & IT ministry, as Minister of State. During his term as the Minister of State for Telecommunication & IT, headed by Shri Arun Shaurie & under the reign of honourable Shri Atal Bihari Vajpayee, he was responsible to initiate the first mobile services ever in Kashmir & the North East of India. He also held the position of National Secretary of BJP.

Although he lost election in 2009, he continues to play an important role in the party & is seen often on news channels on television supporting and speaking on behalf of the party (BJP) on various issues.

In April 2014, he leaves BJP and joined Samajwadi Party.
Again joined BJP on 13 January 2017

Positions held 

1996 : Elected to 11th Lok Sabha
1996–97 : Member, Committee on Labour and Welfare Member, Consultative Committee, Ministry of Railways
1998 : Re-elected to 12th Lok Sabha (2nd term)
1998–99 : Member, Committee on Labour and Welfare Member, Committee on Papers Laid on the Table Member, Consultative Committee, Ministry of Tourism
1999 : Re-elected to 13th Lok Sabha (3rd term)
1999–2000 : Member, Committee on Petroleum and Chemicals
1999–2000 : Member, Committee on the Welfare of Scheduled Castes and Scheduled Tribes 
2 Sep 2001 – 30 June 2002 : Union Minister of State, Ministry of Consumer Affairs, Food and Public Distribution
1 July 2002 : Union Minister of State, Ministry of Labour onwards
Former National Secretary BJP
Former Member of Parliament (Lok-Sabha), Labour & welfare, and Telecommunication & IT.

Early life 

Pradhan was born on 13 December 1953 in Ghondli, Delhi, India; though his family originated from Hisali in Muradnagar, Uttar Pradesh, India. He is the youngest of six siblings, consisting five brothers and one sister. His parents died when he was 4 years old.

Member of 
Standing Committee of Home Affairs
Standing Committee SC/ST welfare
Consultative Committee – labour & Employment
Member of Delhi University Court

Family life 

Pradhan was born to Late Shri Mangat Ram & Late Smt. Thakuri Devi on 13 December 1953. He was the youngest of six siblings consisting five brothers (Late Shri Shugan Chand, Late. Dr. Gyan Chand, Late Shri Prem Chand, & Dr. Hukum Chand) & one sister ( Late Smt. Shakuntala Devi). He got married on 23 November 1983 to Bimla Pradhan (née Lal).

References

External links
 
 
 
 
 

Living people
1953 births
People from Bulandshahr
India MPs 2004–2009
People from Ghaziabad district, India
Bharatiya Janata Party politicians from Uttar Pradesh
India MPs 1996–1997
India MPs 1998–1999
India MPs 1999–2004
Lok Sabha members from Uttar Pradesh